Fork Lagoons is a rural locality in the Central Highlands Region, Queensland, Australia.

The postcode of Fork Lagoons is 4723.

Geography 
Fork Lagoons is bounded to the north and east by Theresa Creek and Retreat Creek to the south.

Kingower Billabong is a billabong in the east of the locality.

There are a number of state forests within the locality: Crystal Creek State Forest, Kettle State Forest and Burn State Forest. Apart from these, the land use is predominantly grazing on native vegetation with a small area of crop growing in the south-east of the locality.

History 
The locality was officially named and bounded on 16 June 2000.

Education
There are no schools in Fork Lagoons. The nearest primary schools are Anakie State School in neighbouring Anakie Siding to the south-west, Capella State School in Capella to the north, and Denison State School and Emerald North State School, both in neighbouring Emerald to the south-west. The nearest secondary schools are Capella State High School in Capella and Emerald State High School in Emerald.

References 

Central Highlands Region
Localities in Queensland